Mark F. Kohler (born July 30, 1960) is an American lawyer and politician who served as the 74th Secretary of the State of Connecticut from July 1, 2022, when he was appointed by Governor Ned Lamont to fill the vacancy created by previous secretary Denise Merrill's resignation, until the end of the term in January 2023. He previously served as an associate attorney general in the Office of the Connecticut Attorney General and as a member of the Town of Woodbridge Zoning Board of Appeals.

Education
Kohler graduated from the University of St. Thomas (then known as the College of St. Thomas) with his Bachelor of Arts in 1982. He then earned his Master of Arts in Political Science from Indiana University Bloomington in 1984, followed by his Juris Doctor from the University of Connecticut School of Law in 1987.

Career

Early Career and Connecticut Attorney General's Office

Kohler was an associate attorney with the law firm Shipman & Goodwin for two years, from 1990 until 1992. Afterwards, he joined the Connecticut Attorney General's Office, where he served for 30 years under attorneys general Richard Blumenthal, George Jepsen, and William Tong. At different points during his tenure, Kohler served as head of the finance department, public utilities unit, and the special litigation department. He also served on the Zoning Board of Appeals in Woodbridge, Connecticut for three years, between 2006 and 2009.

Secretary of the State of Connecticut

Shortly after retiring in early 2022, Kohler was appointed Secretary of the State of Connecticut by Governor Ned Lamont when retiring incumbent Denise Merrill resigned June 30, six months before the expiration of her term. He was sworn in the next day. He was not a candidate in the election for the office in November 2022.

References 

1960 births
21st-century American lawyers
Indiana University alumni
Living people
People from Woodbridge, Connecticut
Secretaries of the State of Connecticut
University of Connecticut School of Law alumni
University of St. Thomas (Minnesota) alumni